Siedliszowice  is a village in the administrative district of Gmina Kroczyce, within Zawiercie County, Silesian Voivodeship, in southern Poland.

The village has a population of 200 persons.

References

Siedliszowice